The following lists events in 1999 in Nigeria.

Incumbents

Federal government
 President: Abdulsalami Abubakar (until 29 May), Olusegun Obasanjo (starting 29 May)
 Vice President: Michael Akhigbe (until 29 May), Atiku Abubakar (starting 29 May)
 Senate President: 
Until 3 June: Abolished
3 June – 18 November: Evan Enwerem 
Starting 18 November: Chuba Okadigbo
 House Speaker: 
Until 3 June: Abolished
3 June – 23 July Salisu Buhari
Starting July Ghali Umar Na'Abba
 Chief Justice: Muhammad Lawal Uwais

Events

February
 February 10 — Former Head of State, Olusegun Obasanjo wins the presidential election.

May
 May 29 — The Nigerian Fourth Republic is inaugurated. Olusegun Obasanjo is sworn in as the second Executive President of Nigeria.

December
 December 19 — President Obasanjo orders troops to raid the town of Odi in the Niger Delta, in response to the murders of twelve policemen at the hands of local militia; The troops razed the town of Odi.

Births

 July 14 – Adijat Adenike Olarinoye, weightlifter

See also
Timeline of Nigerian history

References

 
Years of the 20th century in Nigeria
Nigeria
Nigeria